Galina Mikhailovna Shergova (31 August 1923 – 11 May 2017) was a Soviet and Russian writer who participated in the creation of more than 200 films and TV movies. In 1978, she was the winner of the USSR State Prize.

Biography 
Shergova was born 31 August 1923 in Chita into a family of doctors. Her grandfather was the cantonments. Since 1933 she has lived in Moscow. During the Great Patriotic War she was an employee of the newspaper front of the 5th Panzer Army, The assault!, and received battle wounds. In 1948 she graduated from the Maxim Gorky Literature Institute. She became a poet, and has worked with documentaries since 1959. She worked with Roman Karmen.

As a screenwriter, author and narrator she participated in the creation of more than 200 films and TV movies. Since 1967 she has been a television writer and presenter. She is the artistic director of a television series, and was one of the authors of Minute of Silence.

Family 
Her husband Alexander Yurovsky (writer), professor of Moscow State University (1921–2003).
Kseniya Shergova, daughter, a documentary filmmaker. Two granddaughters.

Awards 
 USSR State Prize (1978)
 Award TEFI — legend of the Russian TV
  Dovzhenko Gold Medal (1975)
 Order of the Patriotic War II degree (1985) 
 Medal for Battle Merit 
 Order For Merit to the Fatherland IV degree (1995)
 Order of Honour (2011) —  for his great contribution in the development of the national broadcasting and many years of fruitful activity

References

External links
 
 Линия жизни Галины Шерговой
 Биографическая справка

1923 births
2017 deaths
People from Chita, Zabaykalsky Krai
Soviet screenwriters
20th-century Russian screenwriters
Recipients of the USSR State Prize
Recipients of the Order of Honour (Russia)
Communist Party of the Soviet Union members
Socialist realism
Maxim Gorky Literature Institute alumni